David Bentley Hart (born 1965) is an American writer, philosopher, religious studies scholar, critic, and theologian. Reviewers have commented on Hart's baroque prose and provocative rhetoric within Hart's over one thousand essays, reviews, and papers as well as nineteen books (including translations and co-authored works). From a predominantly Anglican family background, Hart became Eastern Orthodox when he was twenty-one. His academic works focus on Christian metaphysics, philosophy of mind, Indian and East Asian religion, Asian languages, classics, and literature as well as a New Testament translation with Yale. Books with wider audiences include The Doors of the Sea, Atheist Delusions, and That All Shall Be Saved. In addition to accolades and book awards, Hart has been criticized as heterodox by a variety of Christian scholars.

Born and raised in Maryland, Hart regularly references his family roots and the Baltimore Orioles in his writing. Starting his study of classical and foreign languages in his local public high school, Hart graduated with a BA in interdisciplinary study from the University of Maryland, completed an MPhil in theology at Cambridge, and earned a PhD in religious studies at the University of Virginia. Hart received the Templeton Fellowship at the University of Notre Dame Institute for Advanced Study in 2015 and organized a conference focused on the philosophy of mind.

Hart's translation of the New Testament was published in 2017 with a second edition in 2023. Four of his books have received awards or book of the year recognitions from the Archbishop of Canterbury, Publishers Weekly, the Times Literary Supplement, and the Catholic Media Association. Hart has written essays on diverse topics such as art, baseball, literature, religion, philosophy, consciousness, problem of evil, apocatastasis, theosis, fairies, film, and politics. His fiction includes The Devil and Pierre Gernet: Stories (2012) as well as two books from 2021: Roland in Moonlight and Kenogaia (A Gnostic Tale). Hart also maintains a subscription newsletter called Leaves in the Wind that features original essays and conversations with other writers, including Rainn Wilson and China Miéville. His friendship and common ground with John Milbank has been noted several times by both thinkers.

Early life

Hart notes that most of his ancestors lived in Maryland for generations since their arrival there in 1634. Born in Howard County and graduating from Wilde Lake High School in 1982 with classes in Latin and Greek, Hart was a National Merit Scholar. Hart grew up with two older brothers, one by nine years and one by seven, and writes that this "has always made me feel more like a creature of the 1960's and early 1970's than do some of my friends of roughly my age".

Hart writes that "regional pride dictated that the tender souls of schoolchildren be regularly exposed to the works of H. L. Mencken" and that this shaped his own writing style so that he would spend his life "striving to suppress my assassin's smile while heaping one elaborately vituperative subordinate clause atop another". British author and journalist James Mumford wrote in 2014 that, outside the high school curriculum, Hart took up French, German, Spanish, Italian, Russian, and modern Greek. At the University of Maryland, Mumford notes that Hart studied classics, history, world literature, religious studies and philosophy while also learning to read Chinese and Sanskrit. As a teenager, Hart started to read the early church fathers along with contemporary Eastern Orthodox theologians, and Mumford reports that Hart converted to Orthodoxy at the age of twenty-one.

Academic career
Hart earned a B.A. in interdisciplinary study from the University of Maryland, a M.Phil. in theology from the University of Cambridge, and a Ph.D. in religious studies from the University of Virginia. He taught at the University of Virginia, the University of St. Thomas (Minnesota), Duke Divinity School, and Loyola College in Maryland. He also served as visiting professor at Providence College where he held the Robert J. Randall Chair in Christian Culture. During the 2014–2015 academic year, Hart was Danforth Chair at Saint Louis University in the Department of Theological Studies. In 2015, he was appointed as Templeton Fellow at the University of Notre Dame Institute for Advanced Study. As part of this Templeton Fellowship work, Hart organized a conference focused on the philosophy of mind. Hart is currently a collaborative scholar in the departments of Theology and German for Notre Dame with research responsibilities and no teaching assignments. His primary areas of research have been philosophical theology, systematics, patristics, classical and continental philosophy, and South and East Asian religion with recent focus on the genealogy of classical and Christian metaphysics, ontology, the metaphysics of the soul, and the philosophy of mind.

Hart has authored eighteen books and produced two translated works. The New Testament: A Translation was published in 2017 with Yale University Press and a 2nd edition in 2023. His translation in collaboration with John R. Betz of Analogia Entis: Metaphysics: Original Structure and Universal Rhythm by Erich Przywara was published in 2014 by Eerdmans. Hart's academic books include The Beauty of the Infinite: The Aesthetics of Christian Truth (Wm. B. Eerdmans, 2003), The Experience of God: Being, Consciousness, Bliss (Yale, 2013), The Hidden and the Manifest: Essays in Theology and Metaphysics (Eerdmans, 2017), That All Shall Be Saved: Heaven, Hell, and Universal Salvation (Yale, 2019), Theological Territories: A David Bentley Hart Digest (Notre Dame Press. 2020), Tradition and Apocalypse: An Essay on the Future of Christian Belief (Baker Academic, 2022), and You Are Gods: On Nature and Supernature (Notre Dame Press, 2022).

Literary writing

Since the late 1990s, Hart has published hundreds of essays on varied subjects including Don Juan, Vladimir Nabokov, Charles Baudelaire, Victor Segalen, Leon Bloy, William Empson, David Jones, The Secret Commonwealth of Elves, Fauns and Fairies (1893), and baseball. These often provocative essays have appeared in First Things (2003 to 2020), The New Atlantis, Commonweal, Aeon, The Wall Street Journal, The New York Times, and many other periodicals. Several of these have shaped future books such as  The Doors of the Sea,  Roland in Moonlight, and Atheist Delusions: The Christian Revolution and Its Fashionable Enemies (Yale, 2009). Since May 2021, Hart also writes regular essays for his Leaves in the Wind subscription newsletter. This newsletter also features conversations with other writers such as Rainn Wilson, China Miéville, Tariq Goddard, and Salley Vickers.

Ed Simon writing for the Los Angeles Review of Books in 2022 said that "Hart is often difficult for some people to categorize" with his "thousands of essays, reviews, and papers" but that "what's agreed upon is that he's wide-ranging and deeply read in his seemingly limitless interests, and loquacious in his refreshingly baroque prose style" as well as "the rare theologian" who can "poetically invoke" beauty with descriptions of color and light. In 2017, Hart was described by Matthew Walther (a columnist at The Week and later founding editor of The Lamp) as "our greatest living essayist". Hart's style has been praised for "its thought and humor and spleen" and called "extremely rude". Martyn Wendell Jones has said of Hart's style that, while it may "constantly verge on the immoderate" and rarely "make a point squarely without infusing a bit of accelerant", what might be seen as "needless indulgence" is also "an act of generosity toward his readership" because "his maximalist impulses ...enable him to consistently generate interest on the level of his individual sentences". His essays often mix humor and critical commentary as with one titled "A Person You Flee at Parties: Donald and the Devil" (about Donald Trump from May 6, 2011, for First Things). Hart's essays sometimes explored the boundaries between different religious traditions as with "Saint Sakyamuni" (2009) or the boundaries of orthodoxy as with "Saint Origen" (2015).

In 2012, The Devil and Pierre Gernet, a collection of his fiction, was released by Eerdmans. Two of his books, A Splendid Wickedness in 2016 and The Dream-Child's Progress in 2017, are collections devoted to popular and literary essays that also include several short stories. His short stories have been described as "Borgesian" and are elaborate metaphysical fables, full of wordplay, allusion, and structural puzzles. Hart added two books to his fiction works in 2021: Roland in Moonlight and Kenogaia (A Gnostic Tale). His book Roland in Moonlight has a largely autobiographical framework while consisting primarily of dialogs with his dog Roland as well as accounts of his fictional great uncle Aloysius Bentley (1895-1987). Hart had written previously about both Roland and Aloysius in essays for First Things, with two about Aloysius 2011 and six about Roland from 2014 to 2016. Reviewing Roland in Moonlight for a review in Church Times, John Saxbee (former Bishop of Lincoln) wrote that "sometimes, a book defies description or, rather, refuses to settle into a conventional genre" and compared Roland in Moonlight to Sophie's World meets Alice through the Looking-Glass or Don Quixote meets The Wind in the Willows.

Reception

Hart's first major work, The Beauty of the Infinite (2003), an adaptation of his doctoral thesis, received acclaim from the theologians John Milbank, Janet Soskice, Paul J. Griffiths, and Reinhard Hütter. William Placher said of the book, "I can think of no more brilliant work by an American theologian in the past ten years". Geoffrey Wainwright said, "This magnificent and demanding volume should establish David Bentley Hart, around the world no less than in North America, as one of his generation's leading theologians". In 2020, Theological Territories: A David Bentley Hart Digest was named Best Religion Book of the Year by Publishers Weekly as well as winning Gold in the 2020 INDIES with Foreword Magazine. On May 27, 2011, Hart's book Atheist Delusions was awarded the Michael Ramsey Prize in Theology by the Archbishop of Canterbury, Rowan Williams. It was also praised by the agnostic philosopher Anthony Kenny in The Times Literary Supplement: "Hart has the gifts of a good advocate. He writes with clarity and force, and he drives his points home again and again. He exposes his opponents' errors of fact or logic with ruthless precision". Oliver Burkeman, writing in The Guardian in January 2014, praised Hart's book The Experience of God as "the one theology book all atheists really should read". You Are Gods is a 2022 INDIES Finalist with Foreword Magazine.

Roland in Moonlight was chosen by A. N. Wilson as his November 2021 "Book of the Year" for the Times Literary Supplement. Wilson described this "dialogue with the author's dog Roland, who turns out to be a philosopher of mind, with a particular bee in his bonnet about the inadequacy of materialist explanations for 'consciousness'" as "probably the dottiest book of the year" while noting that "I KEEP returning to it". In 2022, the Catholic Media Association awarded a first place prize to Kenogaia (A Gnostic Tale) in the category of "Escapism" for authors from other traditions.

Criticism and heterodoxy questions

In addition to these accolades, Hart has been criticized by some scholars. New Testament scholar and translator N. T. Wright challenged Hart's translation of the New Testament in January 2018. Hart responded on a few of the points, including on the Eclectic Orthodoxy blog and with his essay "The Spiritual Was More Substantial Than the Material for the Ancients" in Notre Dame's Church Life Journal. Peter Leithart wrote a critical response to Hart's book That All Shall Be Saved called "Good God?" in October 2019 and posted a response from Hart five days later. Edward Feser claimed in April 2022 that Hart's book You Are Gods: On Nature and Supernature advocates pantheism. Gerald McDermott criticized Hart's book Tradition and Apocalypse in July 2022 for "a gnostic reading of Genesis and heterodox views of Christology, creation, and salvation". In late 2022 and early 2023, Fr. James Dominic Rooney wrote several articles for Church Life Journal (with the McGrath Institute for Church Life at the University of Notre Dame) that accused Hart of multiple heresies related to his books That All Shall Be Saved and You Are Gods. Hart responded to Rooney in an interview on the podcast Grace Saves All with David Artman as well as briefly on his Leaves in the Wind subscription newsletter.

Although there are accusations of heterodoxy from some of Hart's Christian critics, especially after his 2019 publication of That All Shall Be Saved, a variety of prominent Christian scholars with strong commitments to traditional Christianity praised the book. Roman Catholic scholar Robert Louis Wilken wrote that "in this original and lively book, Hart shows, why most Christian thinking about eternal damnation is unbiblical", and Orthodox Christian scholar John Behr described the book as "a brilliant treatment — exegetically, theologically, and philosophically — of the promise that, in the end, all will indeed be saved, and exposing the inadequacy — above all moral — of claims to the contrary". Archbishop Alexander Golitzin of the Orthodox Church in America recorded a public interview on January 14, 2022, in which he named Hart's book That All Shall Be Saved and said that it "draws upon some very prominent and worthy and holy teachers" in the early church who held that the "love of God will ultimately overcome the capacity of the creature to say no to God". The archbishop went on to clarify that "we can't teach universal salvation as doctrine, but we can hope for it" which Golitzin identified as "my own attitude ...which I take from Metropolitan Kallistos Ware".

In February 2022, the Greek Orthodox Archdiocese of America (in collaboration with the Orthodox Christian Studies Center of Fordham University) invited Hart to deliver a public homily for the Sunday of the Publican & the Pharisee as part of their "Orthodox Scholars Preach" series. In 2017, Hart served on a special commission of Orthodox theologians for the Ecumenical Patriarch Bartholomew I of Constantinople to help compose "For the Life of the World: Toward a Social Ethos of the Orthodox Church" and to coauthor the preface.

Influences

Hart has cited a wide variety of inspirations and influences in his writing as well as across his various areas of scholarship in religious studies, philosophy of mind, and Christian metaphysics. With his essay style, Hart has often referenced H. L. Mencken as an influence. As literary influences, Hart and others have noted Lewis Carroll and Kenneth Grahame. As "exemplars" in writing English prose, Hart has noted: Robert Louis Stevenson, Sylvia Townsend Warner, J. A. Baker, Patrick Leigh Fermor, and Vladimir Nabokov.

An Anglican convert to Eastern Orthodoxy, Hart has praised Orthodox thinkers such as Kallistos Ware, Alexander Schmemann, John Meyendorff, and Olivier Clément. Hart has also called Ecumenical Patriarch Bartholomew "one of the hopes of Orthodoxy" and Sergei Bulgakov "the greatest systematic theologian of the twentieth century". Hart has expressed his admiration for sophiology and summarized his own understanding of it in his 2010 foreword to Vladimir Solovyov's Justification of the Good. Among American theologians, Hart has called Robert Jenson the theologian with whom it is "most profitable to struggle". Among contemporary thinkers, Hart's friendship and substantial intellectual common ground with John Milbank has been noted several times by both thinkers.

More broadly, Hart and commentators have noted many other influences and inspirations (some of whom Hart can also criticize severely in certain respects). Among New Testament authors, Hart most frequently references Paul. Greek fathers most often referenced by Hart include Gregory of Nyssa, Isaac of Nineveh, Maximus the Confessor, and Symeon the New Theologian. Among medieval thinkers, Eriugena, Meister Eckhart and Nicholas of Cusa are often extolled by Hart, especially in his 2022 book You Are Gods. Among more recent Christian thinkers, Hart has noted a high regard for George MacDonald. Russian religious philosophers such as Vladimir Solovyov and Nikolai Berdyaev are often praised by Hart along with Russian literary figures like Dostoevsky and Tolstoy. Among Indian religious philosophers, Hart has most regularly referenced Ramanuja and Shankara.

Main interests and key ideas

As indicated by the wide range of topics covered in his essays, Hart has diverse interests such as baseball, Comparative religious studies, Gnosticism, metaphysics, The Dreaming, philosophy of mind, theological aesthetics, and world literature. Hart writes often about fairies and has commented several times about his belief in them and related creatures such as mermaids.

Monism

As an outspoken advocate of classical theism as seen, for example, in his book The Experience of God who is also, more generally, engaged with the schools of continental philosophy, idealism, and neoplatonism, Hart also affirms monism. He said in a 17 November 2020 interview about a pre-release reading of his book You Are Gods that "at the end of the day, I'm a monist as any sane person is" and that "we can play games with it, but any metaphysics that is coherent is ultimately reducible to a monism". In the text of You Are Gods, Hart describes variations of both dualism and monism that he calls grim and monstrous:

An absolute dualism, of course, is a very grim thing indeed; but a narrative monism unqualified by any hint of true gnostic detachment, irony, sedition, or doubt—by any proper sense, that is, that the fashion of this world is horribly out of joint, that we are prisoners of delusion, that not every evil can be accounted for as part of divine necessity—turns out to be at least as monstrous.

During an April 2022 conversation with Hart about You Are Gods, John Milbank said we "agree that in fact neoplatonism and Vedanta and Islamic mysticism are monistic" and "that, actually, an emanationism, a monotheism, these are actually the more monistic visions and that, if we've got all these things in Christianity like Trinity, incarnation, grace and deification and so on, these aren't qualifying monism". Instead, Milbank said that Hart's book You Are Gods shows that Christianity is spelling out or expounding monism and monotheism.

Universalism

Hart's book That All Shall Be Saved was published on September 24, 2019, and makes the case that universalism is the only coherent version of the Christian faith. Although grounded primarily in arguments from Christian metaphysics and moral philosophy, the book also considers biblical exegesis, systematic theology, and historical theology (with extensive references to universalist ideas among Christian patristic figures such as Gregory of Nyssa). Hart, with his characteristic rhetorical provocations, uses terms such as "infernalists" to describe his opponents. This grounding in Christian metaphysics, insistence on universalism being the only true articulation of the Christian gospel, and use of combative rhetoric all combine to make Hart's case for universalism more uncompromising than most previous Christian arguments, and this has led to the use of the term "hard universalism" to describe Hart's position.

Atemporal fall

Hart refers to the idea of an atemporal fall (also called meta-historical fall) in his 2005 book The Doors of the Sea as well as in "The Devil's March: Creatio ex Nihilo, the Problem of Evil, and a Few Dostoyevskian Meditations":

The fall of rational creation and the conquest of the cosmos by death is something that appears to us nowhere within the course of nature or history; it comes from before and beyond both. We cannot search it out within the closed totality of the damaged world because it belongs to another frame of time, another kind of time, one more real than the time of death.

...It may seem a fabulous claim that we exist in the long grim aftermath of a primeval catastrophe—that this is a broken and wounded world, that cosmic time is a phantom of true time, that we live in an umbratile interval between creation in its fullness and the nothingness from which it was called, and that the universe languishes in bondage to the "powers" and "principalities" of this age, which never cease in their enmity toward the kingdom of God—but it is not a claim that Christians are free to surrender.

Hart has recommended Sergei Bulgakov's 1939 book The Bride of the Lamb as the best exposition of an atemporal fall.

Personal life
Hart is married and has one grown son, Patrick, with whom he co-wrote the children's book The Mystery of Castle MacGorilla (Angelico Press, 2019). Hart's wife is British and had a toy sheep named Beauchamp Cholmondeley Featherstonhaugh. He has two brothers: Addison Hodges Hart (also an author) and Fr. Robert Hart (rector of Saint Benedict's Anglican Catholic Church in Chapel Hill, NC).

Hart currently lives in South Bend, Indiana and is asked to serve and contribute by leaders in his Orthodox tradition such as the Ecumenical Patriarch of Constantinople. He follows contemporary concerns in Orthodox Christianity such as the "Russian World" (Russkii Mir) teaching. During a September 16, 2022 conversation with Rainn Wilson, Hart shared briefly about an "indescribable" past experience of his own on Mount Athos:

I was in this state of spiritual despair, and I also had an encounter. ...So I understand both the difficulty of explaining it and the impossibility of forgetting it, at once, and how it can change your life. But it doesn't come as a set of instructions. It sure as hell didn't turn me into a saint but did actually make me realize that the spiritual dimension of reality is reality.

Hart is a Christian socialist and a democratic socialist and has been a member of the Democratic Socialists of America. On August 8, 2020, Hart wrote:

I'm basically an anarchist and communalist. I believe that all that lilies of the field nonsense that Jesus preached was more than a daydream; and I think the longing for strict social hierarchy ...as an antidote to modernity is simply a longing for a reprise of the same sins that created modernity.

With a few more specifics, Hart wrote on April 3, 2022:
In my heart of hearts, I want to vote for someone whose entire political philosophy is derived from John Ruskin by way of Kenneth Grahame, with lashings of William Cobbett, Gilbert White, and William Morris; failing that, I want to enjoy the luxury of writing in Wendell Berry on every ballot. But the imminent collapse of the civil order of the entire world doth make pragmatists of us all. I long for the day, however, when I can return to my posture of airily insouciant disdain for the whole system and can again cast votes only for hopeless third party candidates with a clear conscience. But I suspect I will die before that day comes.

References

External links 
 Leaves in the Wind, Hart's subscription newsletter
 Eclectic Orthodoxy, where Hart has been a long-time commenter

1965 births
21st-century American essayists
21st-century American theologians
21st-century Christian universalists
21st-century Eastern Orthodox theologians
Alumni of Lancaster University
Alumni of the University of Cambridge
American Christian socialists
American Christian theologians
American male essayists
Christian continental philosophers and theologians
Christian socialist theologians
Christian universalist theologians
Converts to Eastern Orthodoxy from Anglicanism
Critics of atheism
Duke University faculty
Eastern Orthodox socialists
Eastern Orthodox philosophers
Greek Orthodox Christians from the United States
Living people
Loyola University Maryland faculty
Members of the Democratic Socialists of America
Patristic scholars
Philosophers of mind
University of Maryland, College Park alumni
University of Virginia alumni
University of Virginia faculty
21st-century American male writers